Châteauguay was a federal electoral district in Quebec, Canada, that was represented in the House of Commons of Canada from 1867 to 1917 and from 1979 to 2004.

History

It was created by the British North America Act of 1867. In 1914, it was amalgamated with Huntingdon to become Châteauguay—Huntingdon riding.

The riding was recreated in 1976 from portions of La Prairie and Beauharnois—Salaberry ridings. It consisted of:
 the Towns of Châteauguay, Châteauguay-Centre, Delson, Léry, Mercier, Sainte-Catherine, Saint-Constant and Saint-Rémi;
 in the County of Châteauguay: the parish municipalities of Sainte-Clothilde, Sainte-Martine and Saint-Urbain-Premier; the municipality of Saint-Paul-de-Châteauguay;
 in the County of Laprairie: the parish municipality of Saint-Isidore; the municipality of Saint-Mathieu; the Indian Reserve of Caughnawaga No. 14; and
 in the County of Napierville: the parish municipalities of Saint-Michel and Saint-Rémi.

In 1987, it was redefined to consist of:
 the Towns of Châteauguay, Delson, Mercier, Sainte-Catherine, Saint-Constant and Saint-Rémi;
 in the County of Laprairie: the parish municipalities of Saint-Isidore, Saint-Jacques-le-Mineur and Saint-Philippe; the Municipality of Saint-Mathieu; the Indian Reserve of Kahnawake No. 14; and
 in the County of Napierville: the parish municipalities of Saint-Édouard, Saint-Michel and Saint-Patrick-de-Sherrington.

In 1996, it was redefined to consist of:
 the cities of Châteauguay, Delson, Léry, Mercier, Saint-Constant, Saint-Rémi and Sainte-Catherine;
 the County Regional Municipality of Roussillon, including Kahnawake Indian Reserve No. 14 (Caughnawaga), excepting: the cities of Candiac and La Prairie; the Parish Municipality of Saint-Philippe; and
 in the County Regional Municipality of Les Jardins-de-Napierville: the parish municipalities of Saint-Édouard, Saint-Jacques-le-Mineur and Saint-Michel.

It was abolished in 2003 when it was redistributed into Beauharnois—Salaberry, Saint-Jean and Châteauguay—Saint-Constant ridings.

Members of Parliament

This riding elected the following Members of Parliament:

Election results

1867 - 1917

By-election: On Mr. Holton's death, 14 March 1880

By-election: On Mr. Brown's death, 30 May 1913

1979 - 2004

See also 

 List of Canadian federal electoral districts
 Past Canadian electoral districts

References

External links

Riding history from the] Library of Parliament
1867-1914
1976-2003

Former federal electoral districts of Quebec
Châteauguay
Saint-Constant, Quebec